Acrotaeniostola dissimilis is a species of tephritid or fruit flies in the genus Acrotaeniostola of the family Tephritidae.

Distribution
China.

References

Tephritinae
Insects described in 1937
Diptera of Asia